Balthasar Waltkirk (died 1530) was a German Roman Catholic prelate who became the Bishop of Malta in 1530.

Biography
After the resignation of Cardinal Girolamo Ghinucci as Bishop of Malta in 1530, Pope Clement VII appointed Waltkirk as his successor in Malta. Waltkirk was appointed in the same year when the Knights Hospitallers arrived in Malta. Waltkirk died in the same year of his nomination and never managed to come to Malta.

References

16th-century Roman Catholic bishops in Malta
1530 deaths
Year of birth unknown
Bishops of Malta